The 73ème Rallye Automobile de Monte-Carlo (73rd Monte-Carlo Rally), the first round of the 2005 World Rally Championship season took place between January 21 and 23, 2005.

Results

Special stages
All dates and times are CET (UTC+1).

References

External links
 Results at eWRC.com

Monte Carlo
2005
Rally
Monte Carlo